I Wanna Show You is the third studio album by the Dutch group Twenty 4 Seven. It was released in December 1994 by CNR Music. The group received the Dutch Export Award of 1994 for this record. In 1996, the album also received a Golden Award in South Africa. It reached its highest position at №1 in the (RiSA) South African Album Charts. The album was released in Asia, Netherlands, Czech Republic, Hungary, Poland, Germany, Belarus, Russia, Brazil, Romania, Taiwan, South Africa and Australia. The album was not released in the United Kingdom.

Two singles were released from this album: "Oh Baby" and "Keep on Tryin'".

Track listing
 CD Album

 "Intro" — 2:39 	
 "Gimme More" — 4:40 	
 "Keep on Tryin'" — 4:30 	
 "I Wanna Show You" — 4:49 	
 "On The Playground" — 0:28 	
 "Paradise" — 4:54 	
 "Breakin' Up" — 4:13 	
 "Oh Baby! (Album-Version)" — 5:24 	
 "Words Of Wisdom" — 0:33 	
 "You Gotta Be Safe" — 3:44 	
 "Runaway" — 4:18 	
 "Oh Baby! (Atlantic Ocean Dance Mix)" — 5:07

Charts

Certifications

Credits
Recorded at Ruud van Rijen Music Studio
Rap – Stay-C 
Vocals – Nancy Coolen
Produced and engineered by Ruud van Rijen for RVR Productions

References

1994 albums
Twenty 4 Seven albums